Lautaro is a city and commune of the Cautín Province in Chile's Araucanía Region. The area is named in honor of Lautaro, Mapuche leader (toqui) during the War of Arauco.

Demographics
Of these, 21,071 (65.4%) lived in urban areas and 11,147 (34.6%) in rural areas. Between the 1992 and 2002 censuses, the population grew by 12.2% (3,493 persons).

Administration
As a commune, Lautaro is a third-level administrative division of Chile administered by a communal council headed by an alcalde who is directly elected every four years. For the years 2008-2012, the alcalde is Renato Hauri, and the council members are:
 Raul Schifferli Diaz	
 Miguel Jaramillo Salazar
 Carlos Gutierrez Olguin
 Ricardo Candia Morales
 Cristian Herrera González
 Hugo Salazar Becerra

Within the electoral divisions of Chile, Lautaro belongs to the 49th electoral district and 14th senatorial constituency.

References

External links
 Municipality of Lautaro

Communes of Chile
Populated places in Cautín Province
1881 establishments in Chile